Isithwalandwe/Seaparankoe, until 1994 known as the  Isithwalandwe Medal, also known as the Isithwalandwe Award and  also spelt Isithwalandwe and Isithwalandwe/Seaparankwe, is the highest award given by the African National Congress (ANC) "to those who have made an outstanding contribution and sacrifice to the liberation struggle", that is, those who resisted the apartheid regime in South Africa (1949−1991) in various ways.

Isithwalandwe means "the one who wears the plumes of the rare bird", in particular the blue crane. This type of honor is taken directly from Xhosa culture where the plume of the Ndwe bird was used as an award. It was customarily only given to the bravest warriors, those distinguished by their leadership and heroism.

Recipients
Recipients include:

1955	Yusuf Dadoo 
1955	Father Trevor Huddleston
1955	Chief Albert Luthuli
1975	Moses Kotane
1980	Govan Mbeki
1980	Bishop Ambrose Reeves
1982	Lilian Ngoyi
1988	Ahmed Kathrada
1992	Harry Gwala 
1992	Helen Joseph
1992	Nelson Mandela
1992	Raymond Mhlaba
1992	Wilton Mkwayi
1992	Andrew Mlangeni
1992	Elias Motsoaledi
1992	Walter Sisulu
1992	Oliver Tambo
1994	Joe Slovo
2004	Rachel Simons
2008   Chris Hani
2014   Ruth Mompati
2014   Gertrude Shope
2019   Denis Goldberg
2019   Sophia De Bruyn,
2019   John Nkadimeng
2019   Winnie Madikizela-Mandela
2019   Ahmed Timol
2019   Albertina Sisulu
2019   Charlotte Maxeke

References

External links 
  

South African awards
African National Congress
Military awards and decorations